Bengt Simonsen might refer to:

 Bengt Simonsen (racewalker) (born 1958), Swedish racewalker
 Bengt Simonsen (football) (born 1945), Swedish football (soccer) coach